Meitner may refer to:

Erika Meitner (born 1975), American poet
Lise Meitner (1878–1968), Austrian-Swedish nuclear physicist
Philipp Meitner (1838–1910), Austrian lawyer and chess master; father of Lise

See also
Lotte Meitner-Graf (1898–1973), Austrian photographer
meitnerium, chemical element named after Lise Meitner